Nečtiny is a municipality and village in Plzeň-North District in the Plzeň Region of the Czech Republic. It has about 600 inhabitants.

Administrative parts
Villages of Březín, Čestětín, Doubravice, Hrad Nečtiny, Jedvaniny, Kamenná Hora, Leopoldov, Lešovice, Nové Městečko, Plachtín and Račín are administrative parts of Nečtiny.

References

Villages in Plzeň-North District